Suchá Dolina is a village and municipality in Prešov District in the Prešov Region of eastern Slovakia.

History
In historical records the village was first mentioned in 1330.

Geography
The municipality lies at an altitude of 450 metres and covers an area of 6.123 km². It has a population of about 195 people.

Villages and municipalities in Prešov District
Šariš